Frederick Joseph Rutland,  (21 October 1886 – 28 January 1949) was a British pioneer of naval aviation. A decorated pilot in the First World War, he earned the nickname "Rutland of Jutland"  for his exploits at the Battle of Jutland in 1916.

"Rutland of Jutland"

He joined the Royal Navy as a boy seaman in 1901. He was graded as Flight Sub-Lieutenant in the Royal Naval Air Service (RNAS) in December 1914, awarded his aviator's certificate by the Royal Aero Club on 26 January 1915 after training at Eastchurch and promoted to Lieutenant on 7 January 1916.

At Jutland he served as a pilot on the seaplane tender HMS Engadine. On 30 May 1916, Engadine carried two Short Type 184 and two Sopwith Baby floatplanes and was attached to the 3rd Light Cruiser Squadron.  Engadine accompanied the cruisers when the Battlecruiser Fleet sortied from Rosyth that evening to intercept the German High Seas Fleet. Beatty ordered Engadine to make a search to the north-northeast. At 15:07 Lieutenant Rutland took off in his Type 184 and his observer, Assistant Paymaster George Stanley Trewin, signalled Engadine that they had spotted three German cruisers and five destroyers at 15:30. This was the first time that a heavier-than-air aircraft had carried out a reconnaissance of an enemy fleet in action. After a few other spot reports were transmitted, the aircraft's fuel line ruptured around 15:36 and Rutland was forced to put his aircraft down. He was able to repair it and signalled that he was ready to take off again, but he was ordered to taxi to the carrier on the surface. The aircraft reached the ship at 15:47 and it was hoisted aboard by 16:04. Engadine attempted to relay the spot reports to Beatty's flagship and the flagship of the 5th Battle Squadron, but was unsuccessful. Rutland was awarded the Distinguished Service Cross (DSC) "for his gallantry and persistence in flying within close distance of the enemy light cruisers". He received a Bar to his DSC in 1917 for "services on patrol duties and submarine searching in home waters".

During the Battle of Jutland, the armoured cruiser HMS Warrior had been crippled by numerous hits by German battleships.  At 19:45 Engadine attempted to take her in tow, but the jammed rudder prevented that until it was trained amidships. Early the following morning Warriors progressive flooding had worsened and she was sinking. The captain ordered his ship abandoned after Engadine came alongside to take the crew off at 08:00. About 675 officers and men successfully made it to the much smaller Engadine. Among these were about 30 seriously wounded men who were transferred across in their stretchers; one man fell from his stretcher between the ships, but, against orders, Rutland dived overboard with a bowline to rescue him. For his bravery he was awarded the Albert Medal in Gold. Rutland's Short Type 184, aircraft number 8359, was presented to the Imperial War Museum in 1917, where it was damaged in a German air raid in 1940. The unrestored forward section of the fuselage is now an exhibit in the Fleet Air Arm Museum.

On 28 June 1917, Flight Commander Rutland took off in a Sopwith Pup from a flying-off platform mounted on the roof of one of the gun turrets of the light cruiser HMS Yarmouth, the first such successful launch of an aircraft in history. He did more experiments on the battlecruiser HMS Repulse. It was the first capital ship fitted with a flying-off platform when an experimental one was fitted on 'B' turret in the autumn of 1917. Then Squadron Leader Frederick Rutland took off in a Sopwith Pup on 1 October 1917. Another platform was built on 'Y' turret and Rutland successfully took off from it on 8 October 1917.

Rutland transferred to the Royal Air Force when it was formed in April 1918. He was appointed to command the RAF unit in HMS Eagle in September 1921. He resigned his commission in 1923.

Post-First World War and espionage
Material released by The National Archives on 10 November 2000 revealed that Rutland had come to the notice of MI5 in 1922 when he decided to resign from the RAF. The agency received what it called "reliable information" from a "very delicate source" that the Japanese had secret talks with Rutland. MI5 noted that Rutland possessed "unique knowledge of aircraft carriers and deck landings."

After he left the RAF, Rutland moved to Japan where he was employed helping the Japanese Navy learn about naval aviation. In 1928, he moved back to the UK. The Japanese Navy met Rutland again in London and recruited him to be an agent in Los Angeles. Rutland started a cover business in Los Angeles and another in Honolulu. Later intercepts of Japanese communications showed that Tokyo had paid Rutland to set up a "small agency in Hawaii". He had subsequently provided technical details which helped the Japanese design aircraft carriers, in the years before the attack on Pearl Harbor. This was discovered when Japan's cyphers were broken.

MI6 discovered that Rutland had come to the attention of the US authorities. He returned to Britain on 5 October 1941 and on 16 December 1941 he was interned under Defence Regulation 18B "by reason of alleged hostile associations".

He was divorced in 1924 on the ground of adultery. He had been named as a co-respondent in a divorce case the previous year.

He was interned in 1941-1942 as a result of his associations with the Japanese. His case became famous in the UK when some of his old Royal Navy colleagues demanded his release, saying there was no proof of his doing anything illegal. FBI files released in 2017 contain numerous references to his espionage work for the Japanese Navy. However, as a British national working for the Japanese Navy in the United States before the war, it is arguable that his actions were not against British law.

Rutland died by suicide in 1949.

See also
 William Forbes-Sempill, 19th Lord Sempill
 Pearl Harbor advance-knowledge conspiracy theory
 Japanese spy in Hawaii, Takeo Yoshikawa
 German spy in Hawaii, Kuehn Family

Bibliography 
Notes

References 

 - Total pages: 128 

 - Total pages: 436 
 - Total pages: 323 
 - Total pages: 224 
 - Total pages: 464 
 - Total pages: 191 

Royal Naval Air Service aviators
Royal Air Force squadron leaders
Royal Navy officers of World War I
World War II spies for Japan
1886 births
1949 deaths
Recipients of the Albert Medal (lifesaving)
British collaborators with Imperial Japan
People detained under Defence Regulation 18B
1949 suicides
Suicides by gas
Suicides in the United Kingdom